Puichéric  is a commune in the Aude department in southern France.

The commune is situated between the Aude and the Canal du Midi, and its inhabitants are called Puichéricois.

The name of the commune first appeared in 1063 as Puigeirig.

Population

See also
Communes of the Aude department

References

Communes of Aude
Aude communes articles needing translation from French Wikipedia